Philogène Auguste Galilée Wytsman (12 August 1866 – 1 March 1925) was a Belgian ornithologist, entomologist and publisher most noted for his serial publications Genera Avium and Genera Insectorum.

26 issues of Genera Avium were published between 1905 and 1914. These were written by leading European and British ornithologists. Wytsman himself authored the second family, the Todidae.

Genera Insectorum  was another multi-authored series in begun 1902. This consisted of 219 issues, the last occurring in 1970.

References
 Evenhuis, N. L. 1997: Litteratura taxonomica dipterorum (1758–1930). Volume 1 (A-K); Volume 2 (L-Z). - Leiden, Backhuys Publishers 1; 2 VII+1-426.
Osborn, H. 1952: A Brief History of Entomology Including Time of Demosthenes and Aristotle to Modern Times with over Five Hundred Portraits. - Columbus, Ohio, The Spahr & Glenn Company

External links
 "Kerremans and Wytsman - Genera Insectorum XIIa-d (Buprestidae)", Plates from Wytsman's Buprestidae
BHL – Parts of Genera Insectorum 

1866 births
1925 deaths
Belgian ornithologists
Belgian entomologists
Belgian academics